Floresta may refer to:

Geography 
 Floresta, Paraná, a city in the state of Paraná, Brazil
 Floresta, Pernambuco, a city in the state of Pernambuco, Brazil
 Floresta, Rio Grande do Sul, a neighbourhood in Porto Alegre, Brazil
 Floresta, Boyacá, a municipality in Boyacá Department, Colombia
 Floresta, Buenos Aires, a neighborhood in Buenos Aires, Argentina
 Floresta, Sicily, a municipality in the province of Messina, Sicily
 La Floresta, Uruguay, a small city located in Canelones Department, Uruguay
 La Floresta, Guayaquil, a neighborhood located in Guayaquil, Ecuador

Geology 
 Floresta Formation, a fossiliferous geological formation of the Altiplano Cundiboyacense, named after Floresta, Boyacá

See also 
 La Floresta (disambiguation)